Regional Fodder Station, Hisar is a public funded agricultural research and training institute located at Sirsa road, Hisar in the Indian state of Haryana for fodder research and training.

Details
The Regional Fodder Station, Hisar was set up in 1969 on  farm land by the India Ministry of Agriculture & Farmers Welfare to conduct research in developing high yielding fodder varieties, distributing seeds and imparting training to the farmers.

See also 
 List of institutions of higher education in Haryana
 List of Universities and Colleges in Hisar
 List of think tanks in India

References

External links 
 

Research institutes in Hisar (city)
Agricultural universities and colleges in Haryana
Universities and colleges in Haryana
Universities and colleges in Hisar (city)
Animal husbandry in Haryana
1969 establishments in Haryana
Research institutes established in 1969